Terry Johnston may refer to:
Terry C. Johnston (1947–2001), American writer
Terry D. Johnston (born 1947), American politician from Minnesota

See also
Terry Johnson (disambiguation)